"Let Your Head Go" is a song by British singer-songwriter Victoria Beckham, intended on her unreleased second studio album. It was released as a double A-side with "This Groove" on 29 December 2003 by Telstar Records. In 2004, it was included on the video album The 'Réal' Beckhams, after her record company went bankrupt before it surfaced.

"Let Your Head Go" entered the UK Singles Chart at number three, the highest new entry for the week, and also tied with Emma Bunton's "Downtown" as the highest chart position for a solo Spice Girl since Geri Halliwell's "It's Raining Men" topped the chart in 2001. It became the 88th best selling UK single of 2004.

Background
In 2002, Beckham signed a contract with Telstar Records and 19 Management worth £1.5 million. Beckham then began recording a pop-influenced album, Open Your Eyes, which yielded the single "Let Your Head Go", but she allegedly chose not to release it after being disappointed with the results. Instead of pop and R&B, Beckham wanted a more urban sound and worked with urban producer Damon Dash to work on the hip hop-influenced R&B album Come Together. A Dash-produced track, "It's That Simple" featuring M.O.P., premiered on radio stations in July 2003, generating mixed reviews.

Beckham's first single with Telstar, "This Groove"/"Let Your Head Go", was released in the UK on 29 December 2003 following heavy promotion and many TV appearances across the Christmas period. This double A-side paired "Let Your Head Go" from Beckham's earlier pop and R&B-inspired work with "This Groove", one of her hip hop and R&B songs, and remains Beckham's last single release to date. Outside of the UK, Damon Dash had plans for Beckham in the US, including a potential release of "This Groove / Let Your Head Go" under the name of "Posh Spice Victoria Beckham". The release was proposed for sometime between March to May 2004, but never eventuated.

With the UK media describing her solo music career a failure, combined with a rumoured fall-out between Dash and Fuller, her hip hop album, Come Together, was not released. She was dismissed from Telstar when the company became bankrupt, and gave up music to focus on her fashion career.

Composition
"Let Your Head Go" is a dance-pop and electro-R&B song. The song's lyrics speak about letting oneself go in the form of dancing to music, or to feel free with music (to "let your head go" is to feel free).

Critical reception
Bradley Stern from MuuMuse called the track a "criminally underrated dance-pop tune". Hollywood.com commented that "swansong "Let Your Head Go" restored a bit of dignity".

Chart performance
The single entered the UK Singles Chart at and peaked at number three, charting for eight weeks despite weeks of intense publicity prior to its release. This was the highest new entry for the week. It became the UK's 88th best-selling single of 2004. Like "Out of Your Mind", once again this track was released in the same week as a Sophie Ellis-Bextor track,"I Won't Change You", which reached number 9.

Music video
A music video was released in promotion of the song. The video features Beckham first tearing the clothes in her dressing room and appearing to go crazy over a wire hanger, a reference to Joan Crawford in Mommie Dearest. Beckham is then featured in two dream sequences, once as fragile in the wake of this "breakdown" and is being photographed heavily by paparazzi as she is escorted by psychologists, and once again in the same outfit being ignored by paparazzi, signaling that she is no longer relevant. She wakes from the nightmare and is seen attempting to grab from a box a cross with the letters OBE in neon lights. She is then seen having hair and makeup done and posing in the mirror (including her famous point gesture). She is seen on a throne, giving orders and watching dancers, as she plays with a crown. She walks between the dancers, sets the crown on the floor, walks back to the throne, and the abbreviation "VB" is seen, with her fingers making the letter V. Robert Compsey from Digital Spy noted that the video "proved she can laugh at herself".

Track listings

 UK CD1 
 "This Groove"  – 3:36
 "Let Your Head Go"  – 3:41

 UK CD2 
 "Let Your Head Go"  – 7:20
 "This Groove"  – 4:36
 "Let Your Head Go"  – 3:41
 "This Groove"  – 3:36

 Asian CD
 "Let Your Head Go"  – 3:41
 "This Groove"  – 3:36
 "Let Your Head Go"  – 7:20
 "This Groove"  – 4:36

 Bonus VCD
 "Let Your Head Go" 
 "This Groove"

Credits

 Bass, guitar – James Winchester
 Engineer – Dan Frampton
 Engineer, all additional instruments – Michael Gray and Jon Pearn
 Mastering – Walter Coelho

 Mixing (additional engineering on mixdown) – David Snell
 Producer – Klas Baggstrom, Liz Winstanley, Roger Olsson
 Producer (additional) – Michael Gray and Jon Pearn
 Writers – K. Baggstrom, L. Winstanley, R. Olsson

Charts
All entries charted with "This Groove".

Weekly charts

Year-end chart

References

2003 songs
2004 singles
Songs about dancing
Telstar Records singles
Victoria Beckham songs